Brian or Bryan Andrews may refer to:

Brian Andrews (actor), American actor
Brian Andrews (doctor) (born 1955), Canadian doctor and neurosurgeon
Brian Andrews (singer), American singer with band Day26
Bryan Andrews (cricketer) (born 1945), New Zealand cricketer
Bryan Andrews (filmmaker), American story artist and writer